Gauri Nigudkar is an Indian actress and reality-show anchor. She made her movie debut with the film Uttarayan in 2004, winning the National Film Award for Best Feature Film in Marathi. Nigudkar played the lead role in the soap opera "Betiyaan Apni Yaa Paraaya Dhan" on Star Plus, acted in 9X INX and as the daughter of Vinod Khanna and Smriti Irani in Mere Apne. She did another show for Smriti Irani named 'Waaris' for Zee TV. She has acted in many tv commercials and the most famous of all is her 'taaza thoda sastawala' commercial.

Instagram - www.instagram.com/gauri.nigudkar

Personal life
Gauri's father is a pharmacist, her mother is a chemistry professor. Gauri has done her post-graduation in organic chemistry from University of Mumbai. She is married to Hrishikesh Kunte.

Career
Nigudkar started her career in 2004 with the film Uttarayan, an award-winning national film. The plot of the film is based on the Marathi play "Durgi" written by Jaywant Dalvi. She made her television debut in the television series Betiyaan Apni Yaa Paraaya Dhan in 2007 on Star Plus. She played the lead role of Krishna, the eldest daughter and central character of the show. She played leading roles in the Mere Apne show on 9x and Waaris on Zee TV where she played the daughter of Vinod Khanna and Smriti Irani in Mere Apne.

In 2013, she did a Marathi comedy movie, Sanshay Kallol. Later she played Kavya Dixit in another Marathi film '702 Dixit's '.Nigudkar has done several tv commercials including: Santoor facewash, Whirlpool, Brooke Bond Taaza Tea, California Almonds, Mahindra Gio, Sony pal, Tata i shakti dal, Waman Hari Pethe Jewelers, ICICI home loans, ICICI prudential, Moov, Poppins, Parle must-bites.

She loves food photography and writes a food blog- www.bitesandbokeh.com 
Instagram - www.instagram.com/bitesandbokeh

She pursues her passion for teaching chemistry by writing another blog - https://madoverchemistry.com/

Films

Television

References

Living people
Year of birth missing (living people)
Indian television actresses
Marathi actors
Place of birth missing (living people)